This is a list of awards received by the English rock band The Rolling Stones.

Awards and nominations

Berlin Music Video Awards

!Ref.
|-
| 2021
| "Criss Cross"
| Best Editor
| 
|

Billboard Music Awards

!Ref.
|-
| rowspan=6|1986
| rowspan=2|Themselves
| Top Billboard 200 Artist
| 
|rowspan=6|
|-
| Top Hot 100 Artist
| 
|-
| rowspan=2|Dirty Work
| Top Billboard 200 Album
|
|-
| Top Compact Disk
| 
|-
| "Harlem Shuffle"
| Top Dance Club Play Single
| 
|-
| "One Hit (To the Body)"
| Top Rock Song
| 
|-
| 1994
| rowspan=4|Themselves
| Artist Achievement Award
| 
|-
| 2015
| rowspan=2|Top Touring Artist
| 
|-
| rowspan=2|2016
| 
|-
| Top Duo/Group
|

Billboard Touring Awards

|-
| rowspan=2|2006
| rowspan=2|A Bigger Bang Tour
| Top Tour
| 
|-
| Top Draw
| 
|-
| rowspan=4|2013
| 50 & Counting Tour
| Concert Marketing & Promotion Award
| 
|-
| Themselves
| Eventful Fans' Choice Award
| 
|-
| O2 Arena, London, Nov. 25, 29 2012
| rowspan=3|Top Boxscore
| 
|-
| United Center, Chicago, May 28, 31, June 1
| 
|-
| 2014
| Tokyo Dome
| 
|-
| 2015
| Zip Code Tour
| Top Tour
| 
|-
| 2022
| No Filter Tour
| Top Tour
| 
|-
| 2022
| No Filter Tour
| Top Rock Tour
| 
| -

Classic Rock Roll of Honour Awards

!ref.
|-
| 2010
| Exile on Main St.
| rowspan=2|Reissue of the Year
| 
| 
|-
| rowspan=4|2011
| Some Girls
| 
| rowspan=4|
|-
| Brussels Affair (Live 1973)
| Best Live Band
| 
|-
| Some Girls: Live in Texas '78
| DVD of the Year
| 
|-
| "No Spare Parts"
| rowspan=2|Song of the Year
| 
|-
| rowspan=4|2012
| "Doom and Gloom"
| 
| rowspan=4|
|-
| "Start Me Up"
| Best Commercial 
| 
|-
| 50x50
| Best Book
| 
|-
| rowspan=2|Themselves
| Tour of the Year
| 
|-
| 2013
| Band of the Year
| 
| 
|-
| 2014
| Sweet Summer Sun – Hyde Park Live
| Film of the Year
| 
| 
|-
| 2015
| Sticky Fingers (Deluxe/Super Deluxe)
| rowspan=2|Reissue of the Year
| 
| 
|-
| rowspan=7|2016
| Their Satanic Majesties Request: 50th Anniversary Edition
| 
| rowspan=7|
|-
| Themselves
| Artist of the Year
| 
|-
| "Ride 'Em On Down"
| Song of the Year
| 
|-
| Blue & Lonesome
| Album of the Year
| 
|-
| Zip Code Tour
| Tour of the Year
| 
|-
| The Rolling Stones: Havana Moon
| Best New Live Album or Video
| 
|-
| Totally Stripped
| rowspan=2|Best Archival Live Album or Video
| 
|-
| rowspan=3|2017
| Stones in Air
| 
| rowspan=3|
|-
| Sticky Fingers
| Best New Live Album or Video
| 
|-
| Their Satanic Majesties Request: 50th Anniversary Edition
| Best Box Set or Reissue
|

Denmark GAFFA Awards

!Ref.
|-
| 1996
| rowspan=2|Themselves
| rowspan=2|Best Foreign Live Act
| 
|rowspan=2|
|-
| 1999
|

Grammy Awards

|-
| 1979
|Some Girls
| Album of the Year
| 
|-
| 1982
| Tattoo You
| Best Rock Performance by a Duo or Group with Vocal
| 
|-
| 1984
| Let's Spend the Night Together
| Best Video Album
| 
|-
| rowspan=2|1987
| "Harlem Shuffle"
| Best Rock Performance by a Duo or Group with Vocal
| 
|-
| Themselves
| Grammy Lifetime Achievement Award
| 
|-
| 1990
| "Mixed Emotions"
| rowspan=2|Best Rock Performance by a Duo or Group with Vocal
| 
|-
| 1991
| "Almost Hear You Sigh"
| 
|-
| rowspan=2|1995
| "Love Is Strong"
| Best Music Video, Short Form
| 
|-
| Voodoo Lounge
| rowspan=2|Best Rock Album
| 
|-
| rowspan=2|1998
| Bridges To Babylon
| 
|-
| "Anybody Seen My Baby?"
| Best Pop Performance by a Duo or Group with Vocal
| 
|-
| 2006
| A Bigger Bang
| Best Rock Album
| 
|-
| 2014
| "Doom and Gloom"
| Best Rock Song
| 
|-
| 2018
| Blue & Lonesome
| Best Traditional Blues Album
| 

Grammy Hall of Fame

|-
| 1998
| "(I Can't Get No) Satisfaction"
| rowspan=7|Grammy Hall of Fame
| rowspan=7 
|-
| rowspan=2|1999
| Beggars Banquet
|-
| Sticky Fingers
|-
| 2005
| Let It Bleed
|-
| 2012
| Exile on Main St.
|-
| 2014
| "Honky Tonk Women"
|-
| 2018
| "Paint It, Black"

ECHO Awards

|-
| 1998
| rowspan=5|Themselves 4
| rowspan=3|Best International Group
| 
|-
| 2003
| 
|-
| 2006
| 
|-
| 2012
| Best International Rock/Alternative Act
| 
|-
| rowspan=2|2017
| Best International Group
| 
|-
| Blue & Lonesome
| Album of the Year
|

Hungarian Music Awards

|-
| 1995
| Voodoo Lounge
| Best Foreign Album
| 
|-
| 2006
| A Bigger Bang
| Best Foreign Rock Album
| 
|-
| 2017
| Blue & Lonesome
| Pop/Rock Album of the Year 
|

London International Awards

|-
| 2013
| "Doom and Gloom"
| rowspan=2|Best Editing
| 
|-
| rowspan=3|2017
| rowspan=3|"Ride 'Em On Down"
| 
|-
| Best Music Video
| 
|-
| Best Direction
|

MOJO Awards

|-
| 2005
| Rock and Roll Circus
| Vision Award
|

MTV Video Music Awards

|-
| 1984
| "Undercover of the Night"
| Best Concept Video
| 
|-
| 1986
| "Harlem Shuffle"
| Best Group Video
| 
|-
| 1994
| Themselves
| Video Vanguard Award
| 
|-
| rowspan=3|1995
| rowspan=3|"Love Is Strong"
| Best Special Effects
| 
|-
| Best Cinematography
| 
|-
| Best Group Video
|

NME Awards

|-
| rowspan=2|1964
| Mick Jagger
| British New Disc or TV Singer
| 
|-
| Themselves
| British Rhythm and Blues
| 
|-
| 1965
| "(I Can't Get No) Satisfaction"
| Best New Disc Of The Year
| 
|-
| 1966
| rowspan=3|Themselves
| rowspan=3|Best R&B Group
| 
|-
| 1967
| 
|-
| 1968
| 
|-
| 1978
| Some Girls
| Best Dressed Sleeve
| 
|-
| 2000
| Themselves
| Best Band Ever
| 
|-
| 2009
| Shine a Light
| Best DVD
| 
|-
| 2012
| Some Girls
| Best Reissue
| 
|-
| rowspan=4|2013
| Crossfire Hurricane
| Best Music Film
| 
|-
| Themselves
| Best Live Band
| 
|-
|50
| Best Book
| 
|-
| The Rolling Stones 50th anniversary show at London's O2 Arena
| rowspan=2|Music Moment of the Year
| 
|-
| 2014
| Rolling Stones headline Glastonbury
| 
|-
| 2016
| Sticky Fingers
| Best Reissue
| 
|-
| 2017
| The Rolling Stones: Havana Moon
| Best Music Film
|

Pollstar Concert Industry Awards

!Ref.
|-
| rowspan=3|1990
| rowspan=3|Steel Wheels/Urban Jungle Tour
| Major Tour Of The Year
| 
| rowspan=3|
|-
| Concert Industry Event Of The Year
| 
|-
| rowspan=2|Most Creative Stage Production
| 
|-
| rowspan=2|1995
| rowspan=4|Voodoo Lounge Tour
| 
| rowspan=2|
|-
| rowspan=2|Major Tour Of The Year
| 
|-
| rowspan=2|1996
| 
| rowspan=2|
|-
| rowspan=2|Most Creative Stage Production
| 
|-
| rowspan=2|1998
| rowspan=4|Bridges to Babylon Tour
| 
| rowspan=2|
|-
| rowspan=2|Major Tour Of The Year
| 
|-
| rowspan=2|1999
| 
| rowspan=2|
|-
| Most Creative Stage Production
| 
|-
| 2003
| rowspan=2|Licks Tour
| rowspan=3|Major Tour Of The Year
| 
| 
|-
| 2004
| 
| 
|-
| rowspan=2|2006
| rowspan=4|A Bigger Bang Tour
| 
| rowspan=2|
|-
| rowspan=2|Most Creative Stage Production
| 
|-
| rowspan=2|2007
| 
| rowspan=2|
|-
| Major Tour Of The Year
|

Porin Awards

|-
| rowspan=2|1998
| Bridges to Babylon
| Best Foreign Album
| 
|-
| "Anybody Seen My Baby?"
| Best Foreign Video
| 
|-
| 1999
| Bridges to Babylon Tour '97–98
| Best Foreign Music Film
| 
|-
| rowspan=2|2006
| A Bigger Bang
| Best Foreign Album
| 
|-
| "Streets of Love"
| Best Foreign Song
| 
|-
| 2008
| The Biggest Bang
| rowspan=2|Best Foreign Music Film
| 
|-
| 2014
| Hyde Park Live
|

Q Awards

|-
| 1990
| rowspan=2|Themselves
| rowspan=2|Best Live Act
| 
|-
| 1999
| 
|-
| 2013
| Live at Hyde Park, London
| Best Event
| 
|-
| 2017
| Havana Moon
| Best Video
|

World Music Awards

|-
| 2005
| Themselves
| World's Greatest Touring Band of All Time
| 
|-
| 2014
| GRRR!
| World's Best Album
|

Žebřík Music Awards

!Ref.
|-
| rowspan=3|1994
| rowspan=2|"Love Is Strong"
| Best International Song
| 
| rowspan=4|
|-
| Best International Video
| 
|-
| rowspan=3|Themselves
| Best International Group
| 
|-
| 1995
| Best International Enjoyment 
| 
|-
| rowspan=5|1997
| Best International Group
| 
| rowspan=6|
|-
| Mick Jagger
| Best International Personality 
| 
|-
| Bridges to Babylon
| Best International Album
| 
|-
| rowspan=2|"Anybody Seen My Baby?"
| Best International Song
| 
|-
| Best International Video
| 
|-
| 1998
| Themselves
| Best International Enjoyment
| 
|-
| 2016
| Blue & Lonesome
| Best International Album
| 
| 

Others Awards
{| class=wikitable
|-
! Year !! Awards !! Work !! Category !! Result
|-
| 1977
| Brit Awards
| rowspan=3|Themselves
| Best British Group
| 
|-
| 1981
| American Music Awards
| Favorite Pop/Rock Band/Duo/Group
| 
|-
| 1989
| Rock and Roll Hall of Fame
| Performer
| 
|-
| 1990
| rowspan=2|Japan Gold Disc Awards
| Steel Wheels
| Best Album of the Year - Rock/Folk
| 
|-
| rowspan=4|1991
| rowspan=2|25×5: the Continuing Adventures of the Rolling Stones
| Video of the Year 
| 
|-
| CableACE Awards
| Performance in a Music Special or Series
| 
|-
| ASCAP Pop Music Awards
| "Mixed Emotions"
| Most Performed Song
| 
|-
| Juno Awards
| Themselves
| International Entertainer of the Year
| 
|-
| 1995
| Brit Awards
| "Love Is Strong"
| Best British Video
| 
|-
| 1996
| D&AD Awards
| "Like a Rolling Stone"
| Pop Promo Video (Individual)
| style="background:#FFBF00"| Yellow Pencil
|-
| rowspan=2|1998
| Blockbuster Entertainment Awards
| rowspan=5|Themselves
| Favorite Group - Classic Rock
| 
|-
| GAFFA Awards
| Årets Udenlandske Livenavn 
| 
|-
| 2002
| VH1 Big in 2002 Awards
| Rockin' & Rulin 
| 
|-
| 2011
| Silver Clef Awards
| Best Live Act
| 
|-
| 2013
| Brit Awards
| Best British Live Act
| 
|-
| 2016
| Abilu Music Awards
| Blue & Lonesome
| International Classic Album of the Year
| 
|-
| rowspan=3|2017
| ARIA Music Awards
| rowspan=2|Themselves
| Best International Artist
| 
|-
| rowspan=2|Jazz FM Awards
| Blues Artist of the Year
| 
|-
| Blue & Lonesome
| Album of the Year
| 
|-
| 2021
| Music Week Awards
| Themselves
| Catalogue Marketing Campaign 
|

References

The Rolling Stones